Linha do Leste is a Portuguese railway line which connects Abrantes railway station to the border with Spain, near to Elvas. The connection to Spain was opened on 24 September 1863.

See also
List of railway lines in Portugal
List of Portuguese locomotives and railcars
History of rail transport in Portugal

References

Sources

Les
Iberian gauge railways
Railway lines opened in 1863